La Rinconada may refer to:
La Rinconada, a municipality in the province of Seville, Andalusia, Spain.
La Rinconada, Peru, a municipality in the Peruvian Andes located near a gold mine.
La Rinconada (Albacete), a village of municipality Casas de Lázaro in Albacete, Castile-La Mancha, Spain.
La Rinconada de la Sierra, a municipality in the province of Salamanca, Castile and León, Spain.
Navarredonda de la Rinconada, a municipality in the province of Salamanca, Castile and León, Spain.
La Rinconada Hippodrome, a race track for Thoroughbred horse racing located in Coche, a neighborhood of south Caracas, Venezuela.

See also
Rinconada (disambiguation)